The APG II system (Angiosperm Phylogeny Group II system) of plant classification is the second, now obsolete, version of a modern, mostly molecular-based,  system of plant taxonomy that was published in April 2003 by the Angiosperm Phylogeny Group. It was a revision of the first APG system, published in 1998, and was superseded in 2009 by a further revision, the APG III system.

History

APG II was published as:
Angiosperm Phylogeny Group (2003). "An update of the Angiosperm Phylogeny Group classification for the orders and families of flowering plants: APG II". Botanical Journal of the Linnean Society 141(4): 399-436. (Available online: Abstract | Full text (HTML) | Full text (PDF) doi: 10.1046/j.1095-8339.2003.t01-1-00158.x)

Each of the APG systems represents the broad consensus of a number of systematic botanists, united in the APG, working at several institutions worldwide.

The APG II system recognized 45 orders, five more than the APG system. The new orders were Austrobaileyales, Canellales, Gunnerales, Celastrales, and Crossosomatales, all of which were families unplaced as to order, although contained in supra-ordinal clades, in the APG system. APG II recognized 457 families, five fewer than the APG system. Thirty-nine of the APG II families were not placed in any order, but 36 of the 39 were placed in a supra-ordinal clade within the angiosperms. Fifty-five of the families came to be known as "bracketed families". They were optional segregates of families that could be circumscribed in a larger sense.

The APG II system was influential and was adopted in whole or in part (sometimes with modifications) in a number of references. It was superseded 6½ years later by the APG III system, published in October 2009.

Groups

Main groups in the system (all unranked clades between the ranks of class and order):
angiosperms :
magnoliids
monocots
commelinids
eudicots
core eudicots
rosids
eurosids I
eurosids II
asterids
euasterids I
euasterids II

Shown below is the classification in full detail, except for the fifteen genera and three families that were unplaced in APG II. The unplaced taxa were listed at the end of the appendix in a section entitled "Taxa of Uncertain Position". Under some of the clades are listed the families that were placed incertae sedis in that clade. Thirty-six families were so placed. This means that their relationship to other members of the clade is not known.

 paraphyletic grade basal angiosperms
 family Amborellaceae
 family Chloranthaceae
 family Nymphaeaceae [+ family Cabombaceae]
 order Austrobaileyales
 order Ceratophyllales
 clade magnoliids
 order Canellales
 order Laurales
 order Magnoliales
 order Piperales
 clade monocots
 family Petrosaviaceae
 order Acorales
 order Alismatales
 order Asparagales
 order Dioscoreales
 order Liliales
 order Pandanales
clade commelinids
 family Dasypogonaceae
 order Arecales
 order Commelinales
 order Poales
 order Zingiberales
 clade eudicots
 family Buxaceae [+ family Didymelaceae]
 family Sabiaceae
 family Trochodendraceae [+ family Tetracentraceae]
 order Proteales
 order Ranunculales
 clade core eudicots
 family Aextoxicaceae
 family Berberidopsidaceae
 family Dilleniaceae
 order Gunnerales
 order Caryophyllales
 order Santalales
 order Saxifragales
 clade rosids
 family Aphloiaceae
 family Geissolomataceae
 family Ixerbaceae
 family Picramniaceae
 family Strasburgeriaceae
 family Vitaceae
 order Crossosomatales
 order Geraniales
 order Myrtales
 clade eurosids I
 family Zygophyllaceae [+ family Krameriaceae]
 family Huaceae
 order Celastrales
 order Cucurbitales
 order Fabales
 order Fagales
 order Malpighiales
 order Oxalidales
 order Rosales
 clade eurosids II
 family Tapisciaceae
 order Brassicales
 order Malvales
 order Sapindales
 clade asterids
 order Cornales
 order Ericales
 clade euasterids I
 family Boraginaceae
 family Icacinaceae
 family Oncothecaceae
 family Vahliaceae
 order Garryales
 order Gentianales
 order Lamiales
 order Solanales
 clade euasterids II
 family Bruniaceae
 family Columelliaceae [+ family Desfontainiaceae]
 family Eremosynaceae
 family Escalloniaceae
 family Paracryphiaceae
 family Polyosmaceae
 family Sphenostemonaceae
 family Tribelaceae
 order Apiales
 order Aquifoliales
 order Asterales
 order Dipsacales

Note: "+ ..." = optionally separate family, that may be split off from the preceding family.

References

APG 02

2003 in science
2003 introductions
Angiosperm Phylogeny Group